Flaithem Mac Mael Gaimrid, Irish poet, died 1058.

Flaithem Mac Mael Gaimrid was Chief Ollam of Ireland. The Annals of Inisfallen give his obit as follows- "AI1058.8 Flaithem son of Mael Gaimrid, chief poet of Ireland, rested in Christ in Ard Ferta Brénainn."

External links
 http://www.ucc.ie/celt/published/T100004/index.html

Medieval Irish poets
11th-century Irish poets
11th-century Irish writers
1058 deaths
Year of birth unknown
Irish male poets